Thomas Joseph Abate III (born August 20, 1978 in Lawrence, Massachusetts), also known as Poverty, is a singer, songwriter, hip-hop artist, film director, composer and actor in Los Angeles, California.

He was living in a homeless shelter in Maine when he produced a demo that was eventually picked up by Artistdirect records, the offshoot of Interscope Records chief Ted Field. Kane moved to L.A. in 2001 and wrote for Seth Binzer of the rock band Crazy Town. Through his relationship with Binzer, one of Kane’s demos ended up on the desk of big wig Jimmy Iovine of Interscope Records. Interscope co-founder Ted Field, now of Artist Direct, eventually won the bidding war to secure the right to produce Kane’s music. However, plans to release his album Rise from Ruin foundered in the wake of problems at the label. Kane was approached by Kanye West’s label and also by The Game. The only way Field would let Kane out of his contractual obligations, however, was if each of the artists paid a quarter of a million dollars to Field, which they were not willing to do. The album was released in March 2004, but is no longer available. Artistdirect Records became Radar Records, which eventually became Radar Pictures.

Abate has since started an acting career with a small role in the 2006 film Waist Deep.

Abate is performing under the new pseudonym "Thommy Kane", as well as composing and writing and directing a film.

References

1978 births
American hip hop musicians
Living people